A press cake or oil cake is the solids remaining after pressing something to extract the liquids. Their most common use is in animal feed.

Some foods whose processing creates press cakes are olives for olive oil (pomace), peanuts for peanut oil, coconut flesh for coconut cream and milk (sapal), grapes for wine (pomace), apples for cider (pomace), and soybeans for soy milk (used to make tofu) (this is called soy pulp) or oil. Other common press cakes come from flax seed (linseed), cottonseed, and sunflower seeds.  However, some specific kinds may be toxic, and are rather used as fertilizer, for example cottonseed contains a toxic pigment, gossypol, that must be removed before processing.

Culinary use 
In Nepalese cuisine the oil cake of the Persian walnut is used for culinary purposes, and it is also applied to the forehead to treat headaches.  In some regions it is used as boiler fuel as a means of reducing energy costs, for which it is quite suitable.

Military use 
In 1942 the Porton Down biology department outsourced the production of 5,273,400 linseed press cakes to Olympia Oil and Cake Company in Blackburn Meadows which would then be infected with Bacillus anthracis (bacteria that causes Anthrax) and using in the biological warfare program Operation Vegetarian.

References

Nepalese cuisine

Biogas substrates
Fodder
Food processing